Dance Magazine is an American trade publication for dance published by the Macfadden Communications Group. It was first published in June 1927 as The American Dancer. Dance Magazine has multiple sister publications, including Pointe, Dance Spirit, Dance Teacher, Dance 212, and DanceU101. Dance Magazine was owned by Macfadden Communications Group from 2001 to 2016 when it was sold to Frederic M. Seegal, an investment banker with the Peter J. Solomon Company.

Editors
The first editor and publisher was Ruth Eleanor Howard. Sometime in the 1930s, Paul R. Milton took over as editor. In 1942, the magazine was purchased by Rudolf Orthwine. Lydia Joel became the editor in 1952. In 1970, William Como replaced her, and he was the editor-in-chief until his death in 1989. Richard Philp was the editor-in-chief from 1989 to 1999. Janice Berman took over from Philip late in 1999. Wendy Perron was editor-in-chief from 2004 to 2013.

See also
Dance Magazine's "25 to Watch"

References

External links

 Official Website
 Dance Spirit
Dance Magazine photographs, 1950s-1992, held by the Dance Division, New York Public Library for the Performing Arts.

Monthly magazines published in the United States
Dance magazines
Magazines established in 1927
Professional and trade magazines
Magazines published in New York City
Music magazines published in the United States